"Kauf MICH!" (Buy ME!) is a song by Die Toten Hosen. It's the fourth single and the seventh track from the album Kauf MICH!. The single cover is designed as a typical washing powder box.

The uniqueness of the song is, that lyrically narrator puts himself "on the market", coinciding with the theme of commercialism.

One of the b-sides, "Der heiße Draht", is based on an idea of people calling and singing DTH songs over the phone. For the single, this was divided in three parts. On the re-release of Kauf MICH!, a best-of from these calls was made.

There is also an English version of the song, titled "Put Your Money Where Your Mouth Is (Buy Me!)", which appeared on Love, Peace & Money.

Music video
The video was directed by Hans Neleman. It features mostly touring footage.

Track listing
 "Kauf MICH!" (Breitkopf/Frege, Müller) – 3:30
 "Der heiße Draht (Teil I)" (The hot wire (Part I)) − 6:19
 "Hilfe" (Help) (von Holst/Frege) − 3:24
 "Der heiße Draht (Teil II)" − 6:15
 "I Fought the Law" (Sonny Curtis) − 2:35 (The Crickets cover)
 "Der heiße Draht (Teil III)" − 7:25

Charts

1994 singles
1993 songs
Songs written by Campino (singer)
Songs written by Michael Breitkopf
Die Toten Hosen songs